Sadio Doucouré (born July 27, 1992) is a French-born Malian professional basketball player for Antibes Sharks of the LNB Pro B.

References

External links
Sadio Doucouré at realgm.com

1992 births
Living people
BC Orchies players
Centers (basketball)
Champagne Châlons-Reims Basket players
Chorale Roanne Basket players
JA Vichy players
Malian men's basketball players
21st-century Malian people